Desa Drohulu is a 1964 Indian Telugu-language action drama film, produced and directed by Bolla Subba Rao under the Sri Rama Pictures banner. It stars N. T. Rama Rao, Devika and Kanta Rao, with music composed by S. Rajeswara Rao.

Plot
The film begins in a town, where five people Bhujanga Rao (Mikkilineni), Abbadhaiah (Ramana Reddy), Karunakaran, Devaiah Shetty (Raja Babu), Sanyasi Rao. They are traitors but wear a mask of hypocritical social workers and pose themselves as respectable persons. Once Bhujanga Rao & Abbadhaiah slay one of their wise partner Kesava Rao using a deadly gangster Joginder (Rajanala). There, onwards, Joginder starts blackmailing them. Ramu (N. T. Rama Rao), a young and energetic guy loves Leela (Devika), daughter of Bhujanga Rao. In the beginning, Bhujanga Rao does not agree with the alliance as Ramu is poor. Still, later he accepts due to Leela's pressure. Here Ramu asks some amount from Devaiah Shetty for the marriage expenses, but he refuses when a robbery covers in which Ramu is indicted and sentenced. Now Bhujanga Rao breaks out the proposal and forcibly performs Leela's marriage with a millionaire Raghu (Kanta Rao). After a few days, the truth comes forward, and Ramu is acquitted when he learns regarding Leela's marriage. Depressed, Ramu reaches home, where he notices Devaiah Shetty auctioning their house. At Present, Ramu reaches the city, where he gets acquainted with a stranger Gopi (Relangi), a dance master who gives him shelter. Ramu joins as a worker for Karunakaran and Sanyasi Rao, observes their cheating towards society and resigns. Later, he gets a job in a drama company through Gopi, where he gets meets a social lady, Karuna (Sowcar Janaki).
Meanwhile, Raghu & Leela lead a happy family life, and they are blessed with a baby boy. But unfortunately, Joginder traps Raghu and makes him habituated to all sorts of vices. Once, his men attack Raghu when Ramu protects him. The next day, Ramu visits Raghu's house, where he is surprised to see Leela as Raghu's wife, and Leela gets faint up. Afterward, Ramu meets Leela and promises, he will look at her as his sister right now. Raghu observes their closeness and suspects when the clashes arise between the couple. Soon, Ramu writes a letter to Leela, which comes into Raghu's hand when he realizes the holistic relation between them and repents. He also finds out the reality of Jogindra, who revolts against him, but he goes into his clutches. Ahead, Police are in the process of investigating the evil deeds occurring in society. Ramu, along with Gopi, joins them and removes all the antisocial elements in the society. At last, Ramu catches Joginder too and rescues Raghu & his family. Finally, the movie ends with the marriage of Ramu & Karuna.

Cast

N. T. Rama Rao as Ramu
Devika as Leela
Kanta Rao as Raghu
Rajanala as Jogindra
Relangi as Gopi 
Ramana Reddy as Abbadhaiah  
Mikkilineni as Bhujanga Rao 
Dhulipala as Police Commissioner 
Shobhan Babu as CBI Officer
Ramakrishna as CBI Officer
Satyanarayana as Police Inspector 
Raja Babu as Devaiah Shetty 
Perumallu as Ramanna
Malladi as Police Inspector 
Sowcar Janaki as Karuna 
Girija as Radha 
Geetanjali as Dancer 
Malathi as Ramu's mother 
Gemini Chandra as Mala
Baby Indrani as Vaani

Soundtrack

Music composed by S. Rajeswara Rao. The music was released on H.M.V Audio Company.

References

Indian action drama films
Films scored by S. Rajeswara Rao
1960s action drama films
1960s Telugu-language films